Chinchilla was a napped material made from fine wool. The surface has tufts very close together.

Synchilla 
Chinchilla is a milestone fabric in the evolution of fleece. ''Synchilla'' (Synthetic Chinchillla) was the first generation fleece. In 1985, Synchilla was used in product ''seminal Snap-T pullover'' from Patagonia, Inc., which was popular in ski trips across the Northeast.

Texture 

Chinchilla is an imitated material of Chinchilla hairs, the fabric pile is curled up in tufts.

Use 
Chinchilla is thick, heavy material preferred for overcoats.

References 

Textiles
Wool
Waulked textiles